Mats Laarman (also Mats Laarmann; 8 February 1873 Kaarli Parish (now Mulgi Parish), Kreis Pernau – 13 December 1964 Abja Selsoviet, Viljandi Raion) was an Estonian politician. He was a member of II Riigikogu.

References

1873 births
1964 deaths
People from Mulgi Parish
People from Kreis Pernau
Farmers' Assemblies politicians
Members of the Riigikogu, 1923–1926
Members of the Riigikogu, 1926–1929
Members of the Riigikogu, 1929–1932
Gulag detainees